John Emery may refer to:

John Emery (actor) (1905–1964), American stage, film, radio and television actor
John Emery (bobsleigh) (1932–2022), Canadian Olympic bobsledder
John J. Emery (1898–1976), developer of the Carew Tower in Cincinnati, Ohio
John Emery (English actor) (1777–1822), English actor
John Q. Emery (1843–1928), American educator
John Emery (paediatrician) (1915–2000), British-born paediatric pathologist and professor
John Emery (MP) for Worcester

See also
John Emory (1789–1835), American bishop of the Methodist Episcopal Church
John Emory (baseball) (1886–1968), American Negro leagues baseball player